Arnold F.C. was an English football club based in Arnold, Nottinghamshire.

History
The club were founded in 1928 as Arnold St. Mary's. "St. Mary's" was dropped from the team's name in 1963, as Arnold joined the Midland League that year.

League
The club joined the Midland League in 1963. Throughout the late 1960s and early 1970s they consistently finished in the upper reaches of the league, finishing runners-up in 1971 and 1976.

When the Midland League merged with the Yorkshire League to form the Northern Counties East League (NCEL) in 1982, Arnold were placed in the new league's Premier Division. In 1986 they won 24 games on their way to lifting the title, but rather than move on up to the Northern Premier League they moved down to the Central Midlands League (CML). They spent three years in the CML before merging with Arnold Kingswell to form Arnold Town in 1989.

Cup
Arnold first entered the FA Cup in 1964, and in 1967 they reached the First Round proper of the competition before losing 3-0 at home to Bristol Rovers in front of 3,390 fans. They repeated the feat in 1977, holding Port Vale to a draw at Gedling Road before being beaten 5-2 in a replay at Vale Park. The club also played in the FA Trophy and FA Vase.

Records
 Best F.A Cup performance: 1st Round, 1967-1968, 1977-1978

 Best FA Trophy performance: 2nd Round, 1971-1972

 Best FA Vase performance: 2nd Round, 1987-1988

Honours
 Northern Counties East League Premier Division
 Champions 1985-86
 Runners-Up 1983-84
 Central Midlands League Supreme Division
 Cup Winners 1987-88
 Midland League
 Cup Winners 1974-75
 Central Alliance
 Champions 1962-63
 Nottinghamshire Senior Cup
 Winners 1960-61, 1964-65, 1965-66, 1968-69, 1970-71

References

Central Alliance
Midland Football League (1889)
Arnold Town F.C.
1989 disestablishments in England
Association football clubs disestablished in 1989
1928 establishments in England
Association football clubs established in 1928
Defunct football clubs in Nottinghamshire
Central Midlands Football League
Northern Counties East Football League